Chen Cuiting (born 15 November 1972) is a retired Chinese artistic gymnast who represented China at the 1988 Summer Olympics. She was born in Changsha. The Chinese team finished sixth in the team final, and Chen finished fourteenth in the all-around final. She won a bronze medal with her team at the 1989 World Championships. She also finished sixth in the all-around, fourth on beam, and fifth on floor. She was also a member of the team at the 1987 World Championships that finished in fourth. Individually, she finished eleventh in the all-around and sixth on floor. She competed at the Asian Games twice (1986,1990) and won gold in the team event, the all-around, on floor, and silver on vault both times. The 1990 Asian Games was also her last competition before retirement. After retirement, Chen moved to Hong Kong and worked as a judge at international events. She now has a career in banking in Hong Kong.

Competition history

References 

1972 births
Living people
Sportspeople from Changsha
Chinese female artistic gymnasts
Gymnasts at the 1988 Summer Olympics
Olympic gymnasts of China
Medalists at the World Artistic Gymnastics Championships
Asian Games medalists in gymnastics
Gymnasts at the 1986 Asian Games
Gymnasts at the 1990 Asian Games
Asian Games gold medalists for China
Asian Games silver medalists for China
Medalists at the 1986 Asian Games
Medalists at the 1990 Asian Games
Gymnasts from Hunan
Goodwill Games medalists in gymnastics
Competitors at the 1986 Goodwill Games